Tsai Duei (born 1 December 1947) is a Taiwanese politician who served as the Minister of Transportation and Communications.

References

Living people
Taiwanese Ministers of Transportation and Communications
1947 births
Politicians of the Republic of China on Taiwan from Taichung